Who is Rich? is a 2017 novel by American author Matthew Klam. It is his first novel, and his first published book since his 2001 short story collection Sam the Cat and Other Stories.

References

2017 American novels
Novels set in Massachusetts
2017 debut novels
Random House books